The Hong Kong Society of Medical Informatics was founded in April 1987 by a group of medical practitioners and informatics professionals with special interests in medical informatics and computing and communications.

The society is a non-profit organization registered as a Company Limited by Guarantee.

See also
 Health informatics
 Hospital Authority

Further reading
The Development of eHealth in Hong Kong in the past 20 years
Medical Informatics: The state of the art in the Hospital Authority. Asia Pacific Association for Medical Informatics. Conference No3, Hong Kong, HONG-KONG (27/09/2000 2001, vol. 62, no 2-3 (95 p.)  (27 ref.), pp. 113–119

External links

Hong Kong Academy of Medicine
Asia Pacific Association for Medical Informatics
Hong Kong Society for Medical Informatics @ International Medical Informatics Association
eHealth Consortium

Medical and health organisations based in Hong Kong
Health informatics and eHealth associations